Dyakovskaya is a rural locality (a village) in Kharovskoye Rural Settlement, Kharovsky District, Vologda Oblast, Russia. The population was 12 as of 2002.

Geography 
Dyakovskaya is located 17 km southwest of Kharovsk (the district's administrative centre) by road. Pogost Nikolsky is the nearest rural locality.

References 

Rural localities in Kharovsky District